Acanthophila obscura is a moth in the family Gelechiidae. It is found in China (Shaanxi).

References

obscura
Moths described in 1997
Moths of Asia